Nostoc commune var. sphaeroides is an edible cyanobacterium found in diverse habitats such as lakes and rivers.  It is used as a food and nutritional supplement and has reputed pharmaceutical properties.

References

External links
EL Cushuro o Murmunta, Lo que da fuerza a la vida (Cushuro or Murmunta-that which makes one strong)

Nostocaceae